General elections were held in Jordan on 8 November 1989, the first since 1967. As political parties were banned at the time, all 647 candidates ran as independents, although 22 of the 80 successful candidates were Muslim Brotherhood members. Voter turnout was 53.1%.

See also
1989 Jordanian protests

References

Elections in Jordan
General election
Jordan
Jordan
Election and referendum articles with incomplete results
Jordan